Lower Amble is a hamlet in the civil parish of St Kew (where the population at the 2011 census was included.), Cornwall, England, UK.

References

Hamlets in Cornwall